"Nice While It Lasted" is the series finale of Netflix's animated comedy-drama television series BoJack Horseman. Written by series creator Raphael Bob-Waksberg and directed by Aaron Long, it was released on Netflix on January 31, 2020, alongside the second half of the sixth season. In the episode, titular character BoJack Horseman is arrested and sentenced to prison for breaking and entering, but is granted a furlough to attend the wedding of his ex-girlfriend, Princess Carolyn. The episode was widely praised as a poignant ending to the series.

Plot 
After the events of "The View from Halfway Down", BoJack is rescued from drowning by the occupants of his former house. BoJack is convicted of breaking and entering and is sentenced to 14 months in a maximum security prison.

A year later, BoJack is granted furlough and is picked up by Mr. Peanutbutter to attend Princess Carolyn and Judah's wedding; they head off to buy BoJack a suit for the event and BoJack admits that his prison sentence was "kind of for everything" he'd done over the years. Mr. Peanutbutter takes BoJack to the Griffith Observatory, where he officially gives back the 'D' to the Hollywoo sign in a celebration of the success of his show "Birthday Dad". Due to a misunderstanding, he commissioned a 'B' instead, so that "Hollywoo" is renamed to "Hollywoob".

At the wedding, Todd finds BoJack and asks him for help to go to the beach, saying he wants to sit on BoJack's shoulders to get a better view and adding that he saw BoJack looked overwhelmed at the ceremony and thought a walk would help. The two watch the fireworks for Princess Carolyn and Judah. BoJack tells Todd that he is comfortable being in jail; he stays out of trouble and is beating his sobriety record. Todd convinces him that once he completes his sentence, he just has to set a new record every day. BoJack is amused by his uncertainty over whether Todd is being stupid or smart and Todd cheerfully says "I never know!", before saying his brief moment of metaphorical intelligence was nice while it lasted, with Bojack agreeing it was.

Later, BoJack meets with Princess Carolyn and congratulates her on the wedding reception. Princess Carolyn tells BoJack that Hollywoob is waiting for his comeback with "The Horny Unicorn", and assures him people may give him another chance. BoJack asks Princess Carolyn to dance, and he tells her he fantasized about convincing her to go through with the wedding. Princess Carolyn assures him she does not need that, and she is happy with the decision she made. BoJack tells her that she deserves to be happy, and asks for representation should he decide to re-enter the business. Princess Carolyn smiles, instead offering to 'recommend some excellent people'. BoJack returns a smile as they continue to dance.

Later, BoJack climbs onto the roof and finds Diane smoking. BoJack tells her he misses her, and she reminds him of the voicemail he left when he broke into his old house and nearly drowned. She reveals to him she thought he was dead for seven hours, and how she hates herself for feeling guilty about not taking care of him. BoJack apologizes. Diane reveals that she is happily married to her husband Guy, and they have moved to Houston together. She advises him that there are people who help you become who you are, but they are not meant to stay in your life forever. Diane implies she will be cutting ties with BoJack, but after he tells her "You don't owe me anything" she doesn't make it explicit. When she gets up to leave, BoJack convinces her to stay and let him tell her a "funny" story from prison about how BoJack's efforts to stop the annoying Film Night picks of the jail's gang leader led to that leader picking an even worse movie which they now watch every week. Diane is amused and says it is a nice night, and BoJack agrees. The two stare at the sky in silence.

Critical response
"Nice While it Lasted" has received widespread critical acclaim. The A.V. Club's Les Chappell gave it an A rating, calling it "the right bittersweet close for this bittersweet series", noting its poignant understanding of, and ultimate lessons about, life. Scott Meslow of Vulture.com gave it four out of five stars, praising its emotional depth.

References

External links 
 "Nice While It Lasted" on Netflix
 

BoJack Horseman episodes
2020 American television episodes
American television series finales